Claude Bouxin (17 February 1907 – 23 February 1997) was a French art director. He designed the film sets for over ninety productions.

Selected filmography
 Roger la Honte (1933)
 The Lady of Lebanon (1934)
 Fanatisme (1934)
 Paris (1937)
 The Drunkard (1937)
 Storm Over Asia (1938)
 Thérèse Martin (1939)
 The Last Metro (1945)
 Special Mission (1946)
Rumours (1947)
 Inspector Sergil (1947)
 The Dancer of Marrakesh (1949)
 Sins of Madeleine (1951)
 My Wife, My Cow and Me (1952)
 The Nude Dancer (1952)
 The Agony of the Eagles (1952)
 Double or Quits (1953)
 Three Sailors (1957)
 Let's Be Daring, Madame (1957)

References

Bibliography
 John T. Soister. Conrad Veidt on Screen: A Comprehensive Illustrated Filmography. McFarland, 2002.

External links

1907 births
1997 deaths
French art directors